The  New York–Pennsylvania League season was the league's third season of play. The York White Roses and the Williamsport Grays tied during the regular season and were declared co-champions. An unofficial playoff resulted in York defeating Williamsport 4-2. The New York–Pennsylvania League played at the Class B level during this season.

Final standings

Stats

Batting leaders

Pitching leaders

New York-Pennsylvania League Season, 1925
Eastern League seasons